The Women's sprint competition at the 2020 FIL World Luge Championships was held on 14 February 2020.

Results
The qualification was held at 10:00 and the final at 14:28.

References

Women's sprint